Kurowie  was a Polish noble family, from Mazovia in medieval Poland.

History
The family was first mentioned on 2 May 1239 in Tabulatorium Actorum Antiquorum Varsoviense Maximum. Bolesław I of Masovia confirmed the purchase of the village Doiasdovo by Cur and Jozeph for 7 Grzywna. Their family seat Kurów was probably first mentioned between 1112 and 1118 in the Gesta principum Polonorum of Gallus Anonymus as castrum Galli, which is interpreted as Gall's Castle.

Coat of arms

Notable members

 Mikołaj Kiczka – archdeacon of Gniezno
 Klemens z Kurowa, knight, castellan of Żarnów - allied with the knight Jan Kmita, starost of Kraków.
 Piotr Kurowski ze Szreniawy i Kurowa, knight, starost of Lublin
 Mikołaj Kurowski – Archbishop of Gniezno
 Stanisław Kur – Catholic priest, Protonotary apostolic

Gallery

See also
 Kurów
 von Hahn

Bibliography
 Franciszek Piekosiński: Rycerstwo polskie wieków średnich. Kraków: 1896-1991.
 Edward Breza: Nazwiska Pomorzan: pochodzenie i zmiany, Tom 1. Gdańsk: Wydawn. Uniwersytetu Gdańskiego, 2000, s. 489. .
 Jan Stanisław Bystroń: Nazwiska Polskie. Lwów: Książnica, 1936. .
 Jan Korwin Kochanowski: Zbiór ogólny przywilejów i spominków Mazowieckich. Warszawa: Drukiem W. Lazarskiego Towarzystwo Naukowe, 1919, s. Tom 2, Wydania 259-478.

References